Collide with the Sky is the third studio album by American rock band Pierce the Veil, released on July 17, 2012.

Composition
According to vocalist/rhythm guitarist Vic Fuentes, "King for a Day" is about "standing up to the people who think they are better than you, or try to take advantage of you." He added that he "felt like I wasn't cool enough, or good enough, for some people. It's a very angry song in retaliation to these bottled-up thoughts and emotions".

Album art 
According to Fuentes, "The theme to the album artwork is 'jumping off of the ground that is breaking beneath you.'  The idea is to inspire hope amongst the chaos that may be happening around you. If the ground was breaking beneath your feet, your first reaction may be to run and jump to safety, and it's that moment where you are suspended in the air that I am focusing on. A still frame where you're not sure if the person is falling or flying.  It's about freeing yourself from the things that are breaking or falling apart in your life, and inspiring a sense of hope from the desperation."

Release
It is the band's first release on Fearless Records, as their previous two albums were released on Equal Vision Records. It was made available for pre-order through Merchnow on June 6, 2012. The band touring as part of the 2012 Warped Tour throughout July and August  The album's first single, "King for a Day", was released on June 5, 2012. It features Kellin Quinn of Sleeping with Sirens as a guest vocalist. "Bulls in the Bronx" was chosen as the second single and released on June 26, 2012. On August 6, the band released a music video for "King for a Day". The video features the band "taking down the bad guy and gettlng back at him for treating us poorly", according to Fuentes. Preciado came up with this idea "because he'd always wanted to do a 'heist'."

They went on their first ever headlining UK tour in September. In October and November, the band went on the headlining Collide with the Sky Tour in the US with support from Sleeping with Sirens, Tonight Alive and Hands Like Houses. On December 21, "Hell Above" was released as a single, along with a live music video. In February and March 2013, the band performed at Soundwave festival in Australia. In April and May, the band went on the Spring Fever tour, a co-headlining North Amerlca tour with All Time Low, with support from Mayday Parade and You Me at Six. In September and October, the band supported A Day to Remember on the House Party tour in the US.

Reception

The album entered the U.S. Billboard 200 at number 12, selling over 27,000 copies in its debut week. The album has sold over 120,000 copies as of May 2013. As of March 2016, the album has sold nearly 350,000 copies. In October 2016, the album was certified gold by the Recording Industry Association of America (RIAA) for combined sales and album-equivalent units of over 500,000 units.

The album has been received well by critics. Alternative Press rated the album 4/5 stars saying "Collide with the Sky is PTV's best work to date". They praised the album for the power pop hooks on "Props & Mayhem", saying that you should download "Tangled in the Great Escape". AbsolutePunk commented that the album is "sure to continue Pierce the Veil's steady ascent to the top of their league", concluding that "[it] proves Pierce the Veil are seemingly still one step ahead of everyone else when it comes to concocting energetic slices of post-hardcore and that they won't be dropping the ball any time soon."

Track listing 
All songs by Vic Fuentes and Mike Fuentes, except where noted.

Bonus tracks

Personnel
Personnel per digital booklet.

Pierce the Veil
Vic Fuentes – lead vocals, rhythm guitar
Mike Fuentes – drums
Jaime Preciado – bass guitar, backing vocals
Tony Perry – lead guitar

Additional musicians
Kellin Quinn (Sleeping with Sirens) – vocals on "King for a Day"
Jason Butler (letlive., Fever 333) – vocals on "Tangled in the Great Escape"
 Lindsey Stamey (Oh No Fiasco) – vocals on "Hold on Till May"
Dave Yaden – piano, keyboards

Production
 Dan Korneff, Kato Khandwala – producers
 Dan Korneff – mixing
 Brian Robbins – additional engineer, digital editing
 John Bender – engineer
 Jim Romano – digital editing, assistant engineer
 Alex Prieto – digital editing, guitar tech
 Ted Jensen – mastering
 Aaron Marsh for Forefathers Group – cover illustration, layout design
 Daniel Danger - artwork concept

Chart positions

Weekly charts

Year-end charts

Certifications

Release history

References 
Citations

Sources

External links

Collide with the Sky at YouTube (streamed copy where licensed)

2012 albums
Pierce the Veil albums
Fearless Records albums